Business communication is communication that is intended to help a business achieve a fundamental goal, through information sharing between employees as well as people outside the company. It includes the process of creating, sharing, listening, and understanding messages between different groups of people through written and verbal formats. The way that people communicate and operate within a business is very vital to how successful the company will be in the business world. Business communication occurs internally, employee-to-employee, or externally, business-to-business or business-to-consumer. This internal and external communication can happen through verbal or non-verbal communication methods. Often these internal and external forms of communication come with barriers, which can prevent the receiver from understanding the information sent by the sender.

Overview/History

The word communication has been derived from the Latin word communis which implies common. Thus communication may be defined as the interchange of thoughts and information to bring about mutual understanding.

Business communication is closely related to professional communication and technical communication. It encompasses topics such as marketing, brand management, customer relations, consumer behavior, advertising, public relations, corporate communication, community engagement, reputation management, interpersonal communication, employee engagement, internal communication, and event management.

Communication in general is valued even more in international business communications to allow for the understanding of cultures and the overall morale of the operation.

Business communication focuses primarily on achieving goals/aims and, in the case of a public company or organization, increasing the dividends of shareholders.

Types of business communication

Internal 

Business-to-employee communication, also known as workplace communication, is the exchange of information within an organization. The purpose of some communications is to develop trust, and/or to increase productivity

This type of business communication includes the flow of information from one level of the business hierarchy to another. Communication that flows from the top of the hierarchy to the bottom ("top-down communication") has been shown to decrease the stress levels of employees if it provides clarification and reassurance to the worker. The amount of information shared in this way is often dependent on a "need to know" basis. This communication may take the form of memos and other internal documents. Although a certain level of top-down communication is helpful, too much communication can be seen by the employee as micromanagement. Upward communication is any communication within the business that is passed through the business hierarchy from the bottom upwards. Suggestion boxes, which allow low-level workers to communicate with management anonymously, are one example of upward communication. Horizontal communication occurs between individuals who are on the same level in the business hierarchy.

External 
Business-to-business communication is sharing information between different other companies, often done to benefit both parties. Business communication can help the company achieve its fundamental goals by informing, persuading, and building good relations with other companies to reach mutual goals.

Business-to-consumer communication, also known as direct-to-consumer, is when a company directly communicates with its consumers about product details or company information. The opposite is when a consumer leaves reviews on a product (or service), which may identify how the company could improve its product.

Methods of business communication 
These internal and external types of business communication occur through verbal and non-verbal methods of communication.

Some forms of verbal communication
 Internet
 Email
 Print media
 Radio
 Word of mouth

Some forms of non-verbal communication

 Body language
 Sign language
 Eye contact
 Paralinguistics

Television is an example of a medium which provides both verbal and non-verbal communication. 

Face-to-face meetings and presentations are popular methods of communication between employees within an organization; they increasingly feature audiovisual material, like copies of reports, or material prepared in Microsoft PowerPoint or Adobe Flash. Means such as telephone conference and letters allows for communication over long distances. In the 21st century, computer-mediated communication, such as video conferencing and email, has become increasingly prevalent in business. Formal reports are also important in documenting the activities of any department.

Barriers to business communication 
There are several barriers that a business might experience when communicating with business partners. Such barriers can prevent one from receiving or understanding messages others use to convey information, ideas, and thoughts.

 Language
 Cultural
 Behavioral
 Attitudinal
 Environmental

These often arise because of differences in the states of mind, body, and perspective between sender and receiver, which are a result of how encoding or decoding processes occur.

Business communication studies 
Higher learning institutions offer communication courses, and many are now offering business communication courses. These courses teach students how to communicate more effectively. Attending these courses help students understand the communication barriers they might experience when communicating with others. It is suggested that 93% of employers believe that clear communication skills are more important than the students' actual major area of study. Communication competence is an ability that is sought after by employers and often leads to professional success.

Managing negative news 
In a business communicating negative news is unavoidable. At one point or the other, it had to be done. It may be about giving the employees some constructive feedback on their work or informing them that they are being laid off. It may have a serious effect on them based on how you choose to deliver those messages.

While communicating negative news, if possible, at first provide some good news, express gratitude, have agreement or understanding, and then discuss and explain the reasons that led to the decision. while communicating negative news, we must be non-judgmental and use non-discriminatory language while doing so. We must be compassionate and fair to them. The next step is to explain the bad news clearly without overemphasizing it, avoid using negative language, and end the communication on a positive and friendly note

Organizations 
Founded in 1936 by Shankar is the Association for Business Communication (ABC), originally called the Association of College Teachers of Business Writing, is "an international, interdisciplinary organization committed to  advancing business communication research, education, and practice."
The IEEE Professional Communication Society (PCS)  is dedicated to understanding and promoting effective communication in engineering, scientific, and other environments, including business environments. PCS's academic journal, is one of the premier journals in Europe communication. The journal’s readers are engineers, writers, information designers, managers, and others working as scholars, educators, and practitioners who share an interest in the effective communication of technical and business information.
The Society for Technical Communication is a professional association dedicated to the advancement of the theory and practice of technical communication. With membership of more than 6,000 technical communicators, it's the largest organization of its type in North America.
The International Business Communication Standards are practical proposals for the conceptual and visual design of comprehensible reports and presentations.

See also 
Strategic talk

References 

Human communication
Business process